Chris Prosinski (born April 28, 1987) is a former American football safety. He played college football at the University of Wyoming.

Early life
Prosinski attended Buffalo High School in Buffalo, Wyoming, where he played football. He was the top-ranked football recruit in Wyoming in the class of 2006. He committed to play college football for the University of Wyoming.

College career
Prosinski was a senior captain at the University of Wyoming. He was voted Second-team All-Mountain West Conference at the conclusion of the 2009 and 2010 seasons.

Professional career

Jacksonville Jaguars
The Jacksonville Jaguars selected Prosinski with a fourth round pick in the 2011 NFL Draft.

Prosinski was waived/injured on September 23, 2014.

Philadelphia Eagles
Prosinski was signed by the Philadelphia Eagles on November 3, 2014. He took the roster spot of DeMeco Ryans, who had suffered a season-ending injury one day earlier.

Chicago Bears
Prosinski was signed by the Chicago Bears on September 29, 2015. Prosinski recorded his first career sack against the Denver Broncos on November 22, 2015. Despite allowing a 48-yard touchdown on the first drive of the game, he ended it with six tackles and a sack. The following week, he led the team in tackles with nine, while also recording his first career forced fumble.

On March 25, 2016, Prosinski signed a one-year contract with the Chicago Bears worth $840,000. His base salary is $760,000 and his guaranteed signing bonus was $80,000.

On March 20, 2017, Prosinski re-signed with the Bears. He was placed on injured reserve on September 2, 2017. He was released on September 4, 2017. On November 30, 2017, Prosinski was re-signed by the Bears. He was placed on injured reserve on December 23, 2017, after suffering a concussion in Week 15. He was released with an injury settlement on December 28, 2017.

Personal life
Prosinski attended Buffalo High School in Buffalo, Wyoming. On June 27, 2015, Prosinski married Miss Wyoming 2012, Lexie Madden.

References

External links
 Wyoming Cowboys Bio
 Jacksonville Jaguars

1987 births
Living people
People from Newcastle, Wyoming
Players of American football from Wyoming
American people of Polish descent
American football safeties
Wyoming Cowboys football players
University of Wyoming alumni
Jacksonville Jaguars players
Philadelphia Eagles players
Chicago Bears players
People from Buffalo, Wyoming